Allan Dick (born 8 June 1983 in Kirkcaldy, Fife) is a male field hockey goalkeeper from Scotland, who earned his first cap for the Men's National Team in 2003. He plays club hockey for Southgate HC. His younger brother Stephen is also a member of the men's national squad.

References
sportscotland

1983 births
Living people
Scottish male field hockey players
Field hockey players at the 2006 Commonwealth Games
Sportspeople from Kirkcaldy
Southgate Hockey Club players
Commonwealth Games competitors for Scotland